is a passenger railway station in located in the city of Tsu,  Mie Prefecture, Japan, operated by the private railway operator Kintetsu Railway.

Lines
Takadahonzan Station is served by the Nagoya Line, and is located 64.1 rail kilometers from the starting point of the line at Kintetsu Nagoya Station.

Station layout
The station was consists of two opposed side platforms , connected by a level crossing. The station is unattended.

Platforms

Adjacent stations

History
It was renamed to its present name on November 1, 1918. The Ise Railway became the Ise Electric Railway on September 12, 1926, which merged with the Sangu Express Electric Railway on September 15, 1936. On March 15, 1941, the Sangu Express Electric Railway merged with Osaka Electric Railway to become a station on Kansai Express Railway's Nagoya Line. This line in turn was merged with the Nankai Electric Railway on June 1, 1944 to form Kintetsu.

Passenger statistics
In fiscal 2019, the station was used by an average of 810 passengers daily (boarding passengers only).

Surrounding area
Ise Railway Ise Line Higashi-Ishinden Station
Takadahonzan Senshuji Temple
Takada Junior High School / High School / Takada Junior College

See also
List of railway stations in Japan

References

External links

 Kintetsu: Takadahonzan Station 

Railway stations in Japan opened in 1915
Railway stations in Mie Prefecture
Stations of Kintetsu Railway
Tsu, Mie